Scott Novak (born February 20, 1971 in Miami, Florida) is an American Football Official  in the National Football League (NFL) since the 2014 NFL season, wearing uniform number 1.

Personal life
Novak resides in the Denver, Colorado area.

Officiating career

Early years
Novak served several seasons in the NFL Officiating Development program. Prior to entering the NFL, Novak was in the Big 12 conference and worked as a referee and deep wing official. He was the referee for the 2012 BCS National Championship Game between Alabama and LSU.

NFL career
Novak was hired by the NFL in 2014 as a field judge, and was promoted to referee with the start of the 2019 NFL season following the retirements of Pete Morelli and Walt Coleman. He is the first NFL official to wear the uniform number 1.

2022 Crew 

 R: Scott Novak
 U: Ramon George
 DJ: Derick Bowers
 LJ: Walt Coleman
 FJ: Tra Boger
 SJ: David Meslow
 BJ: Terrence Miles
 RO: Matt Sumstine
 RA: Tim England

References

1971 births
Living people
National Football League officials